Victory Day is a holiday observed in the United States state of Rhode Island with state offices closed on the second Monday of August. Furthermore, in 2017, WPRI-TV claimed that Arkansas (which stopped celebrating the day in 1975) and Rhode Island were the only two states to ever celebrate the holiday, though Arkansas's name for the holiday was "World War II Memorial Day."

The holiday celebrates the conclusion of World War II and is related to Victory over Japan Day in the United Kingdom and regions of the United States. Rhode Island retains the date as a formal state holiday in tribute to the number of sailors it sent and lost in the Pacific front. More than one in ten of the states' residents served in the war, and 2,340 (671 Navy or Marines) were killed. In 2015, the Space and Rocket Center in Huntsville, Alabama honored 500 veterans on the 70th anniversary of the end of the war.

History

Victory Day has commemorated the anniversary of Japan's surrender to the Allies in 1945 which ended World War II. The atomic bombs dropped on Hiroshima on August 6 and Nagasaki on August 9, and the Soviet Union's invasion of Manchuria in the previous week led to the eventual surrender.  President Truman's announcement of the surrender started mass celebrations across the United States, which was when he declared September 2 as the official "VJ Day" in 1945. In 1975, the holiday was abolished at the Arkansas state level leaving Rhode Island as the only state in the U.S. where the holiday is a legal holiday. Rhode Island has observed this day since 1948. Initially observed on August 14, the Rhode Island General Assembly enacted legislation in 1966 to observe the holiday on the second Monday in August annually.

According to WPRI-TV, Rhode Island has had debates over whether to retain the state holiday, with opponents citing Japan's growing "economic might" in the 1980s and offense to Japanese Americans, but all efforts to remove or rename the holiday have been defeated by "veterans and traditionalists," as well as labor unions.

See also
 Public holidays in the United States
 Federal holidays in the United States
 Victory over Japan Day

References

Public holidays in the United States
August observances
Holidays and observances by scheduling (nth weekday of the month)
State holidays in the United States
Annual events in Rhode Island
Rhode Island culture
Japan–United States relations